Alfonso Oliverio Elías Cardona (born 15 January 1941) is a Mexican politician from the Party of the Democratic Revolution. From 2000 to 2003 he served as Deputy of the LVIII Legislature of the Mexican Congress representing Zacatecas.

References

1941 births
Living people
Politicians from Zacatecas
Party of the Democratic Revolution politicians
21st-century Mexican politicians
Deputies of the LVIII Legislature of Mexico
Members of the Chamber of Deputies (Mexico) for Zacatecas
Autonomous University of Chihuahua alumni